The WAGR G class is a class of steam locomotives operated by the Western Australian Government Railways (WAGR) from 1889. The class's wheel arrangement varied; the first 24 were 2-6-0s and the last 24 4-6-0s.

History
A total of 48 G class engines were acquired by the WAGR between 1889 and 1899, both new and second-hand. They were the first class of locomotives to be introduced to the WAGR network in quantity. They were part of what became almost an Australian  standard, as locomotives of similar design served in large numbers as the Silverton Tramway Y class, South Australian Railways Y class and Tasmanian Government Railways C class, and also in Queensland and on the Emu Bay Railway and North Australia Railway.

They were designed by Beyer, Peacock & Co who built seven, with James Martin & Co building 29 and Neilson & Co 12.

During World War II, 13 were loaned to the Commonwealth Railways for use on the North Australia Railway as their Nfc and Nga classes. Others were sold for further use by timber mill operators in Western Australia while some saw further service with the Chillagoe Railway & Mining Co, Cairns. The class remained in service in significant numbers until the 1960s.

Survivors
Several have been preserved:
G53: plinthed at Pemberton
G117: on display at Merredin station
G118: on display at Kalamunda station
G123: Koombana Queen preserved by the Hotham Valley Railway
G233: Leschenault Lady under restoration at the Western Australian Rail Transport Museum, previously operated services out of Bunbury in the 1970s, was overhauled by Rail Heritage WA volunteers at Midland Railway Workshops in 1999 and operated out of Kalgoorlie

See also

History of rail transport in Western Australia
List of Western Australian locomotive classes

References

Notes

Cited works

External links

Beyer, Peacock locomotives
Railway locomotives introduced in 1889
G WAGR class
2-6-0 locomotives
4-6-0 locomotives
3 ft 6 in gauge locomotives of Australia